is a railway station in the city of Nikkō, Tochigi, Japan, operated by the private railway operator Tōbu Railway. The station is numbered "TN-53".

Lines

Station layout
The station consists of a single island platform serving two tracks, connected to the station building by a footbridge.

Platforms

Adjacent stations

History
It was renamed Shin-Takatoku on 22 October 1929.

From 17 March 2012, station numbering was introduced on Tōbu lines, with Shin-Takatoku Station becoming "TN-53".

The platform and passenger shelter on the platform received protection by the national government as a Registered Tangible Cultural Property in 2017.

Passenger statistics
In fiscal 2019, the station was used by an average of 335 passengers daily (boarding passengers only).

Surrounding area
 Kinugawa River
 
 Fujiwara-Takatoku Post Office

References

External links

 Tobu station information 

Railway stations in Tochigi Prefecture
Stations of Tobu Railway
Railway stations in Japan opened in 1917
Tobu Kinugawa Line
Nikkō, Tochigi
Registered Tangible Cultural Properties